was released January 23, 2009 in Japan as part of the Japanese DVD release for The Machine Girl. It is a brief side-story or gaiden to The Machine Girl rather than a direct sequel. This version stars gravure idol Noriko Kijima as Yoshie, who has not only a machine-gun arm but another gun which extends from her lower anatomy.

Synopsis
Yoshie's friend, Ami Hyūga, was murdered and desecrated by the Kimura Gang (in the first movie). She was saved and, like Ami in the previous film, received modifications from the same mechanics. Remembering her past, Yoshie decides to avenge herself and Ami.

Cast
 Noriko Kijima as Yoshie
 Minase Yashiro as Ami Hyūga (flashback sequences) (archive footage)
 Asami Miyajima as Miki Sugihara (as Asami Sugiura)
 Hiroaki Murakami
 Yūya Ishikawa as Suguru Sugihara
 Demo Tanaka as Kaneko/Kimura gang member
 Kentarō Kishi as Yōsuke Fujii
 Yukihide Benny  (as Yukihide Benii)
 Kentarō Shimazu as Ryūji Kimura/Kimura gang boss
 Takatoshi Naoi
 Masahiro Aoki

References

External links
 Shyness Machine Girl at Spopro.net, via Wayback Machine
 

2009 films
2009 action thriller films
2000s Japanese-language films
2000s science fiction horror films
2009 comedy films
Japanese science fiction horror films
2000s Japanese films